Bambusa blumeana, also known as spiny bamboo or thorny bamboo, is a species of clumping bamboo occurring in Tropical Asia.

This bamboo is known locally as: kawayang tinik in the Philippines, buluh duri in Malay and tre gai or tre lá ngắn in Vietnam.

Description
The stem consists of a number of short sections separated by nodes. The main branches are borne on the upper half of the culms, those on the lower part being slender and armed with thorns.

Distribution and habitat
Where Bambusa blumeana originated is unclear, but it may have been native to Indonesia and Borneo. Its range now includes the Philippines, Thailand, Vietnam, southern China and Japan. It has also been introduced to Madagascar, Guam, and some other Indo-Pacific islands. It tolerates acid soils, clay and occasional flooding, but not saline soils.

Uses
Young shoots of Bambusa blumeana are boiled and eaten as a vegetable, being harvested when they first emerge from the ground. The plant is used as a living fence between fields, as a windbreak around homesteads and to prevent erosion on river banks. The poles are useful as a lightweight scaffolding but are not durable enough for building construction; other uses include basket-making, furniture manufacture, parquet, toys, chopsticks and kitchen utensils. The culms of this bamboo, along with those of Dendrocalamus asper, are the main source of bamboo pulp used to make paper.

Bambusa blumeana is sometimes cultivated as an ornamental plant. Propagation can be from seed, but the plant only flowers once every few years, so seed is often unavailable. Clumps can be divided when new growth is commencing, or culms can be cut into sections and used as cuttings.

Gallery

References

External links 
 
 

blumeana
Flora of Indo-China
Flora of Malesia
Plants described in 1830